The following lists events that happened during 1901 in New Zealand.

Population
A New Zealand census was held in March 1901. The population was given as 815,862, consisting of 43,112 Māori, 31 Moriori, and 772,719 others. – an increase in the non-Māori population of 9.86% over the previous census in 1896.

The figures for the 1901 census revealed that the North Island's population had exceeded the South Island's for the first time since the Central Otago Gold Rush of 1861 – the two islands (plus their associated minor offshore islands) had populations of 390,579 and 382,140 respectively. Only 40% of the country's population was based in urban centres, and only two of these centres, Auckland and Dunedin, had populations of over 25,000.

Incumbents

Regal and viceregal
Head of State – Victoria (until 22 January), succeeded by Edward VII
Governor – The Earl of Ranfurly GCMG

Government
The 14th New Zealand Parliament continued. In government was the Liberal Party.
Speaker of the House – Maurice O'Rorke (Liberal)
Premier / Prime Minister – Richard Seddon
Minister of Finance – Richard Seddon

Parliamentary opposition
 Leader of the Opposition – William Russell, (Independent) until 3 July, then vacant.

Main centre leaders
Mayor of Auckland – Logan Campbell
Mayor of Wellington – John Aitken
Mayor of Christchurch – William Reece then Arthur Rhodes
Mayor of Dunedin – Robert Chisholm then George Denniston

Events 

 28 January – Captain William James Hardham became the first New Zealand-born winner of the Victoria Cross as a result of action in the South African War (Boer War).
 2 February – a day of mourning acknowledging the death of Queen Victoria brings the nation to a standstill.
 Union of the Synod of Otago and Southland with the Northern Presbyterian Church to form the Presbyterian Church of Aotearoa New Zealand.
 A second visit to New Zealand by members of the Royal Family: the Duke and Duchess of Cornwall (later to become George V and Queen Mary).
 The New Zealand red ensign became the official flag for merchant vessels.
 Founding of the New Zealand Socialist Party.
 New Zealand rejects the proposal to become a state in the Commonwealth of Australia
 Richard Seddon adopts the term Prime Minister rather than Premier.

Arts and literature

See 1901 in art, 1901 in literature

Music

See: 1901 in music

Sport

Chess
National Champion: D. Forsyth of Dunedin.

Golf
The 9th National Amateur Championships were held in Auckland
 Men: Arthur Duncan (Wellington) – 3rd title
 Women: E.S. Gillies

Horse racing

Harness racing
 Auckland Trotting Cup: Thorndean

Rugby
 The Earl of Ranfurly announced his intention to present a cup to the NZRFU, without stipulating what form of competition it should be awarded for.
 A New Zealand representative team won both test matches against a touring team from New South Wales.

Soccer
Provincial league champions:
	Auckland:	Grafton AFC (Auckland)
	Otago:	Roslyn Dunedin
	Wellington:	Wellington Swifts

Births
 7 February: Arnold Nordmeyer, politician.
 26 February: Leslie Munro, diplomat.
 25 March: Raymond Firth, ethnologist.
 10 April: Robert Aitken, physician and university administrator.
 17 May: Robert Macfarlane, politician.
 19 May: William Stevenson, industrialist and philanthropist.
 13 June: John Cawte Beaglehole, historian and biographer.
 15 June: Dove-Myer Robinson, long-serving mayor of Auckland.
 5 July: Len Lye, sculptor, filmmaker, writer.
 24 December: Nola Luxford, silent film actress.

Deaths
 14 February: Edward Stafford. politician and 3rd Premier of New Zealand.
 17 April Loughlin O'Brien, politician. 
 15 July: Frederic Carrington, surveyor and politician.
 6 August (in Scotland): John McKenzie, politician
 2 September: 
 Charles Brown, politician
 Benjamin Crisp, carrier and temperance reformer
 27 September: Matthew Holmes, politician
 5 December Francis Rich, politician and farmer.

See also
List of years in New Zealand
Timeline of New Zealand history
History of New Zealand
Military history of New Zealand
Timeline of the New Zealand environment
Timeline of New Zealand's links with Antarctica

References

External links